The Cyprus Postal Museum is a postal museum in Cyprus.

The museum is located within the city walls of Nicosia and details the postal and philatelic history of Cyprus. Exhibits date from the 18th century onwards.

References

 

Museums with year of establishment missing
Museums in Nicosia
Philatelic museums
Philately of Cyprus